Guy Stair Sainty,  (born 7 December 1950) is a British art dealer and author on nobility, royal genealogy, and heraldry.

Life and education
Guy Stair Sainty is the son of Christopher Lawrence Sainty and Virginia Cade Stair, grand-daughter of Alfred Stair. His father was Chief Engineer and Director of Carrier Engineering Co Ltd. He attended Highfield School in Hampshire and Westminster School, London, and continued his education in Rome and at The College of Law in London. In 1979, he moved to New York but returned to Europe in 2002, first to Paris and then to London where the Stair Sainty Gallery has been based since 2005. The gallery specialises primarily in French and Spanish painting from the sixteenth to the early twentieth century and has sold works of art to many of the world's great museums, publishing catalogues on a range of artists and schools.

He married, firstly, on 5 February 1983, Cynthia Holland Ash Volk, with three children, Charles, Clementine, and Della.  The marriage ended in divorce in 1993 and ecclesiastical annulment in 1995. Sainty married Elizabeth Frost Pierson, the daughter of W. DeVier Pierson and Shirley Phelps Pierson, née Frost, a private dealer in 19th and 20th century art in New York, in Washington on 28 May 1995 and in a second  ceremony at the London Oratory on 28 September 1995. With Elizabeth he had three children, George, Julian and Arabella.

Sainty is a half-brother, by his father's first wife, of Sir John Sainty, retired Clerk of the Parliaments.

Appointments, awards, and decorations
Sainty has had an interest in the subject of chivalry and heraldry for many years. He is a Fellow with the International Commission on Orders of Chivalry.  Sainty is a correspondent member of the Real Academia Matritense de Heraldica y Genealogia (Royal Academy of Heraldry and Genealogy of Madrid). He has served for more than twenty years as one of the consultants to the Committee on the Orders of Saint John of the Sovereign Military Order of Malta and The Alliance of the Orders of St. John of Jerusalem.

Sainty has served as a County Staff Officer (Sussex) in the St. John Ambulance. He was first appointed an Associate Officer (Brother), then promoted to an Associated Commander (Brother) on 16 June 1989, and again promoted to the rank of Associate Knight of the Venerable Order of Saint John on 30 July 1992. He was transferred to full membership as a knight of Justice with the change of Statutes in 1999, and served as Vice-Chancellor of the Priory in the US until June 2008, but has since transferred to the central roll of the Order.

Sainty is an armiger, having had arms granted by the College of Arms in London, and matriculated at the Court of the Lord Lyon in Edinburgh. Sainty has also served as a senior county staff officer to H.R.H. Prince Tomislav of Yugoslavia. He was formerly a member of the Savoy Order of Saints Maurice and Lazarus but resigned in 2006 and is the Vice-Grand Chancellor of the Sacred Military Constantinian Order of Saint George (Hispano-Neapolitan branch), of which he is a Bailiff Grand Cross. In 2018 the Boletín Oficial del Estado published "The Constantinian Order of Saint George" by Sainty, the first publication in English by the BOE, with a translation in Spanish published in 2020.

On 15 January 2014, Sainty was awarded the rank of Commander (Encomienda) of the Order of Isabella the Catholic by King Juan Carlos I and received unrestricted permission to wear the decorations on 27 July 2017.

  Knight of Justice of the Venerable Order of Saint John of Jerusalem 
   Knight Commander with Star of the Order of Saint Gregory the Great 
  Commander (Encomienda) of the Order of Isabella the Catholic

Dynastic Orders
  Bailiff Grand Cross of the Sacred Military Constantinian Order of Saint George

Libel suit by Rosario Poidimani

In December 2003, Rosario Poidimani sued Sainty in an Italian court for libel, on account of his published analysis of the claims to the Portuguese throne of Maria Pia de Saxe-Coburgo e Bragança and Rosario Poidimani.  In August 2010 Rosario Poidimani won a decision against Sainty in the court of Vicenza; for defamation allegedly caused by the article; Sainty was ordered to pay twenty thousand euro in the judgment. In March 2016, the Italian Court of Appeal of Venice decided in Sainty's favour, rejecting the claim of Poidimani. (No. 730/2016 published 30/03/2016, RG n. 2667/2010, Repert. n. 680/2016 del 30.03.2016.)

References

External links
Poidimani against Stair Sainty
Stair Sainty Galleries
 Guy Stair Sainty's Coat of Arms as a heraldic bookplate
World Orders of Knighthood and Merit

Living people
American male writers
American book editors
British emigrants to the United States
English genealogists
English businesspeople
Alumni of The University of Law
English book editors
British heraldists
American heraldists
People educated at Westminster School, London
Knights of Justice of the Order of St John
Knights of St. Gregory the Great
Writers from London
People from Manhattan
People from Burgess Hill
English art historians
1950 births